Norman Park is a suburb in the City of Brisbane, Queensland, Australia.

Geography
It borders East Brisbane, Coorparoo, Camp Hill, Morningside and Hawthorne, and is mostly residential.

Toponymy
Norman Park is likely named after an early estate in the area. The estate is thought to have derived its name in the 1890s from the nearby Norman Creek, and the contemporary Governor of Queensland Henry Wylie Norman.

History

Norman Park began taking in the first settlers in 1853. One of the early Deeds of Grant was in 1854 to Louis Hope of land totalling about 40 acres. Hope was a grazier and Ormiston Sugar Mill owner.

Initially, development in Norman Park was slow and almost ceased after the 1893 Brisbane floods. Industries in Norman Park at the time included dairying, leather and brooms.

Norman Park State School opened on 9 July 1900.

Between 1912 and 1926 a steam tram service to Belmont connected with the Queensland Government Railway at Norman Park. Initially the service was operated by the Belmont Shire Council. The service was suspended in 1924. The service was reinstated by the Brisbane City Council in 1925, but was again suspended in 1926. In 2006 remnants of the tramway's right of way could still be seen close to the railway station.

A major subdivision of 364 housing lots occurred in 1922 of the land formally owned by Louis Hope, however Norman Park remained a largely rural area until after World War II, when rapid development took place as the result of the construction of public housing.

In the 1940s and 1950s, extensive reclamation of land in the low-lying areas created parks and playing fields.

On Sunday 13 July 1924 Archbishop Gerald Sharp laid the foundation stone for the new brick Anglican Church of the Transfiguration at 40 Agnew Street to replace an earlier timber church. On 26 October 1924 Archbishop Sharp officially opened the church, dedicating it as a World War I memorial. Its final service was held on 25 February 2010. As the church was heritage listed, it could not be demolished so it was sold for $2.4M and redeveloped with an extension as a private home.

The Baptist Sunday school and hall in Norman Park were officially opened on Saturday 4 April 1936 by Reverend George Haughan (President of the Queensland Baptist Union). The buildings were built at the rear of the block of land to allow a church to be built at the front at a later time. It was an initiative of the younger members of the Jireh Baptist Church in Fortitude Valley.

Our Lady of the Assumption Primary School opened on 3 February 1948 and closed on 9 December 1973.

Norman Park Uniting Christian School opened on 1981 and closed on 1983.

Agnew School opened in Agnew Street on 3 February 2003. The school relocated to Wakerley in 2008 and, as at 2020, is known as the Brisbane campus of One School Global. It is associated with the Plymouth Brethren Christian Church.

Demographics
The median age of the population was 33; four years younger than the Australian median. 77.2% of people living in Norman Park were born in Australia, compared to the national average of 69.8%. The other most common countries of birth were England (3.8%), New Zealand (3.4%), South Africa (0.8%), Germany (0.7%), and Ireland (0.7%). 87.4% of people only spoke English at home, while the next most commonly spoken languages were Greek (0.8%), German (0.6%), French (0.5%), Italian (0.5%), and Japanese (0.4%). 

Heritage listings 

Norman Park has a number of heritage-listed sites, including:
 68-88 Agnew Street: Norman Park State School
 75 McIllwraith Avenue: Eulalia
 97 Wynnum Road: former Brisbane City Council Tramways Substation No 9

Education 
Norman Park State School is a government primary (Prep-6) school for boys and girls at 68-88 Agnew Street. In 2017, the school had an enrolment of 457 students with 36 teachers (29 full-time equivalent) and 16 non-teaching staff (11 full-time equivalent). Coorparoo State School in Coorparoo and Seven Hills State School in Seven Hills also enrol students from the southern part of Norman Park.

There are no secondary schools in Norman Park. The nearest secondary school is Coorparoo Secondary College in Coorparoo.

Public transport
Three radial bus corridors pass through the suburb. The Wynnum Road corridor in the suburb's north is serviced by three bus routes that travel between the Brisbane central business district and eastern suburbs. These routes when combined offer frequent service with a long span, particularly on weekdays. The Stanley Street East-Canara Street-Crown Street-Bennetts Road corridor through the centre of the suburb is serviced by one all-stops bus route that travels between the Brisbane central business district and Carindale Shopping Centre bus station. This route has limited frequency and span. This corridor is also serviced by two alternating express bus routes between the Brisbane central business district and Cannon Hill Shopping Centre bus station and eastern suburbs, observing Norman Park and Norman Park North express stops. These two routes when combined provide frequent service with a relatively long span. The Stanley Street East-Milsom Street-McIlwraith Avenue corridor in the suburb's south is serviced by one all-stops route that travels between the Brisbane central business district and Cannon Hill Shopping Centre bus station. This route has limited frequency and span, but is supplemented during peak periods by a limited stops route that runs express along Stanley Street East.

The Cleveland railway line passes through the suburb, with Norman Park station located centrally. Trains operate at a 15-minute off-peak frequency and higher peak period frequency during weekdays, and a lower 30-minute frequency on weekends. This line has a long service span.

Norman Park Ferry Terminal is located off Wynnum Road in the suburb's north. The cross-river ferry service was ended in 2020 by the Brisbane City Council due to low passenger numbers.

Despite the suburb being well serviced by three modes of public transport, no formal coordination exists between them aside from the TransLink (South East Queensland) fare structure and relatively high frequency standards. The suburb is situated within TransLink Zone 2, which makes it attractive to city commuters with respect to relatively cost-effective transit travel.

Walking and cycling
The suburb's terrain varies from flat on the Norman Creek floodplain in the suburb's south and west towards Coorparoo and East Brisbane, to hilly in the suburb's north towards Hawthorne and Morningside, and east towards Seven Hills and Camp Hill. Traffic conditions are busy along its major roads including Canara Street-Crown Street-Macrossan Avenue, Bennetts Road, and Wynnum Road. Recreational cycling opportunities are consequently limited on the north and east sides of the suburb. However, the presence of parkland between Norman Avenue and Norman Creek, including the Norman Creek Cycleway, provides for good opportunities on its south and west sides. As at February 2016 several citywide cycle routes pass through the suburb. This includes Wynnum Road, which has a shared pedestrian/bicycle path due to narrow traffic lanes, Canara Street-Crown Street-Macrossan Avenue, which is line-marked as a Bicycle Awareness Zone (yellow stencil stylized bicycle marked on edge of vehicle travel lane), and Bennetts Road, which has formal bicycle lanes south of Agnew Street. Packs of cyclists are commonplace along these routes early on weekend mornings.

The hilly terrain in the suburb's north and east sides, busy traffic conditions and bisection by the Cleveland railway line also impose some impediment to local walking opportunities. However, the semi-grid structure of the road and street network and the presence of urban borders (verges) on almost all roadways promote relatively direct and safe walking conditions. The higher order local streets and the major roads mostly have paved footpaths on one or both sides. The major roads contain numerous signalised intersections with pedestrian control, which are typically located adjacent to bus stops. Refuge islands support safe crossing of certain other roads and streets. In addition to local pocket parks, nearby recreational walking attractions include parkland and sporting fields along both banks of Norman Creek, rugby fields at C.P. Bottomley Park, Norman Park Ferry Terminal and Canning Bridge reserves on the south bank of the Brisbane River, and Balmoral Park in Morningside. Seven Hills Bushland Reserve is also located within walking distance of the eastern side of Norman Park.

Notable people
 Kevin Rudd, former Australian prime minister, owned a property in Norman Crescent, Norman Park while he was in office. He has since sold it.
Wally Lewis once owned a property in Power Street, Norman Park

See also
 List of tramways in Queensland

References

Further reading

External links

 

 
Suburbs of the City of Brisbane